Clearfield may refer to:

Places 
 in Australia
Clearfield, New South Wales

 in United States of America
Clearfield, Iowa
Clearfield, Pennsylvania
Clearfield, South Dakota
Clearfield, Utah
Clearfield (UTA station), Utah Transit Authority commuter rail station
Clearfield, Wisconsin
Clearfield County, Pennsylvania
Clearfield Township, Griggs County, North Dakota
Clearfield Township, Butler County, Pennsylvania
Clearfield Township, Cambria County, Pennsylvania

Other uses 
 Clearfield Production Systems, a herbicide system marketed by BASF involving imidazolinone herbicides such as imazaquin
 Clearfield Doctrine, a legal principle derived from the US Supreme Court decision in Clearfield Trust Co. v. United States (1943)